The Seventh Life Path is the seventh studio album by Norwegian gothic metal band Sirenia. It was released on May 8 in Europe, May 11 in the United Kingdom and May 12, 2015 in North America through Napalm Records. This will be the first record released by the Austrian record company since An Elixir for Existence. It is their last album featuring longtime Spanish female vocalist Ailyn.

Cover art
Sirenia contacted renowned artist Gyula Havancsák of Hjules Illustration and Design to illustrate the cover for their newest album.

Regarding the other symbols in the cover art, Gyula mentions that the band:

Track listing

Personnel

Sirenia
Morten Veland – vocals, all other instruments
Ailyn – vocals

Session musicians
Joakim Næss – clean male vocals on "Elixir"
Damien Surian, Mathieu Landry, Emmanuelle Zoldan and Emilie Bernou – The Sirenian Choir

Additional notes
Spanish translation on "Tragedienne" by Ailyn
"The Seventh Life Path" was recorded in Audio Avenue Studios (Tau, Norway), additional recordings were done in Sound Suite Studios (Marseille, France)
Produced and engineered by Morten Veland
Pre-produced in Audio Avenue Studios (Tau, Norway)
Mixed and mastered by Endre Kirkesola at dUb studios (Oslo, Norway)
Cover artwork, design and layout by Gyula Havancsák
Band photos by Fotograf Tom Knudsen

Charts

References

External links
 Gyula Havancsák's website
 Metallum Archives

2015 albums
Sirenia (band) albums
Napalm Records albums